Oleksandra Petrivna Skoropadska (née: Durnovo; 23 May 1878 – 29 December 1952) was a spouse of Ukrainian political and military leader Pavlo Skoropadskyi, a member of the Skoropadsky family and Hetman of Ukraine (1918).

11 January 1898, she married Pavlo Skoropadskyi From 1923, she worked at the Ukrainian Red Cross Assistance, which was also called the Ukrainian Refugee Assistance and was headed by her. The main purpose of the organization was to assist the refugees who kept arriving in Germany.

Family 

 father Petro Pavlovyh Durnovo (of a notable family of Russian statesmen and landowners)
 mother Maria Vasiliyevna Kochubey (of Ukrainian Cossack Kochubey noble family).
 spouse Pavlo Skoropadskyi (1873–1945) was a Ukrainian aristocrat, military and state leader, Ukrainian Army general of Cossack heritage. 
She have six children:
 Maria (1898–1959), who married Adam de Montrésor.
 Yelyzaveta (1899–1976), who married Mr. Kuzhym, a painter, sculptor, leader of Hetman Movement (1959-?).
 Petro (1900–1956), who suffered from epilepsy.
 Danylo Skoropadsky (1906–1957).
 Pavlo (1915–1918), who died from disease.
 Olena Skoropadska-Ott (1919–2014), who married Gerd Ginder (died on 10 April 1945) on 31 August 1943, and married Ludwig Ott on 20 March 1948; her two children are:
Alexandra (born 30 January 1954), she married Martin König and had a son Dimitri (born 1989).
Irene (born 30 January 1954). She married cultural event manager Roger Cahn (1948 - 2018).

References

1878 births
1952 deaths
First Ladies of Ukraine
Ukrainian people of Russian descent